John S. Koudounis is an American business executive who currently serves as president and chief executive officer for Calamos Investments. Previously he was the president and chief executive officer for Mizuho Securities USA Inc., a subsidiary of Japanese banking holding company Mizuho Financial Group He is a regular commentator for television and financial news programs including Fox Business, CNBC, CNN, Bloomberg, and others. At 44 years of age, Koudounis was the youngest CEO of any Wall Street firm when he was appointed in 2010.

Koudounis is the Founder of the Chicago CEO COVID-19 Coalition and a member of the Leadership Council at Concordia as well as the prestigious Bretton Woods Committee. He is a board member of the National Hellenic Museum, a patron of the Prince’s Trust International, and an executive advisory board member for the SEAL Future Foundation. In addition, he is a founding board member and executive committee member of The Hellenic Initiative, a member of Leadership 100 and Chairman of the Metropolis of Chicago Foundation. In October 2016 he was inducted as an Archon of the Ecumenical Patriarchate in the Order of St. Andrew.

Early life and education

Koudounis was raised in Chicago. He attended Niles West High School in Skokie, Illinois where he was class president and played basketball and football. He was awarded several scholarships for football and decided to matriculate in the Ivy League.

Koudounis chose to attend Brown University in Providence, Rhode Island. Although he was originally pre-med, he double majored in International Diplomacy and Foreign Affairs and Economics, and played football at Brown. He also interned for the late Senator John Chafee and at Kidder Peabody, working in the office on Black Monday in 1987.

Career

After receiving his degree from Brown in 1988, Koudounis obtained a position with Merrill Lynch where he began his financial career. Merrill Lynch had the most competitive program on Wall Street, choosing only nine undergrads worldwide and appointing them associates right out of college. Koudounis also worked for ABN AMRO North America where he was the company's head of fixed income. He spent a total of 12 years with ABN AMRO.

Koudounis began working for Mizuho Securities USA Inc. in 2008. He served as the executive managing director and head of fixed income, responsible for the firm's activities in trading, sales, and investment banking. In his first year at the company, his division earned more than the entire firm had in its entire history. In 2010, Koudounis was appointed president and CEO of the company. He also sat on the company's executive management committee, risk committee, and new product committee. When he became the company's CEO in 2010, he was the youngest CEO on Wall Street at the age of 44. As well as having direct management responsibilities in the Americas, he served on the management team in Tokyo for the global organization.

In early 2016, Koudounis was appointed CEO of Calamos Investments, a global investment management firm headquartered in Naperville, Illinois.  Koudounis, whose appointment was effective at the beginning of April 2016, leads the firm's business activities, including executing the firm's growth strategy and expanding the firm's global footprint.

He became the firm’s first designated CEO appointed by Founder John Calamos, Sr, as part of Calamos’ succession plan.

Koudounis is the Founder  of the Chicago CEO COVID-19 Coalition an organization he created  in 2020 during the pandemic to provide COVID-19 relief and recovery for the city and bring Chicago’s business leaders together in a time of need. This initiative focused on four critical areas in COVID recovery: food, shelter/homelessness, counseling services, and PPE. The Coalition distributed over $1.5 million in proceeds from its successful telethon.

Koudounis' career expands beyond that of a business executive. He is a public speaker and has given commentary for television and news media outlets including CNBC, Bloomberg Television, -Fox Business TD Ameritrade Network, and Yahoo Finance Live. Koudounis  is a member of the Leadership Council at Concordia and the prestigious Bretton Woods Committee He is a member of the board of trustees of the National Hellenic Museum, a patron of the Prince’s Trust International,  and an executive advisory board member for the SEAL Future Foundation. He is a founding board member and executive committee member of The Hellenic Initiative, a non-profit, non-governmental organization with the aim of supporting Greece and Cyprus in the aftermath of the financial crisis by helping to foster entrepreneurship in both countries. He is also a member of Leadership 100 and Chairman of the Metropolis of Chicago Foundation. In October 2016 he was inducted as an Archon of the Ecumenical Patriarchate in the Order of St. Andrew, the highest honor bestowed on a layman by the Orthodox Church.'''

Personal life

Koudounis is married and has two children, twin daughters.

See also

 Financial services
 List of Brown University people

References

Living people
Brown University alumni
Mizuho Financial Group
American chief executives
Year of birth missing (living people)